Guraleus verhoeffeni is a species of sea snail, a marine gastropod mollusk in the family Mangeliidae.

Description

Distribution
This marine species occurs off Western Sumatra, Indonesia.

References

External links
  Tucker, J.K. 2004 Catalog of recent and fossil turrids (Mollusca: Gastropoda). Zootaxa 682:1–1295.
  von Martens (1904) Die beschalten Gastropoden der deutschen Tiefsee-Expedition, 1898–1899.. In. A. Systematisch-geographischer Theil., vol. 7 Wissenschaftliche Ergebnisse der deutschen Tiefsee-Expedition auf dem Dampfer "Valdivia" 1898–1899, 1–146

verhoeffeni
Gastropods described in 1904